Bosnia and Herzegovina competed in the Winter Olympic Games as an independent nation for the first time at the 1994 Winter Olympics in Lillehammer, Norway.  Previously, Bosnian and Herzegovinian athletes competed for Yugoslavia at the Olympic Games.

Competitors
The following is the list of number of competitors in the Games.

Alpine skiing

Men

Women

Bobsleigh

Cross-country skiing

Men

Luge

Men

Women

References

Sources
Official Olympic Reports

Nations at the 1994 Winter Olympics
1994
Olympics